Callispa fulvonigra, is a species of leaf beetle found in Sri Lanka.

Description
Body length is about 4.80 mm. Body oblong and brownish. Head dark brown. Oval-shaped eyes are black. Antennae blackish and about 1.75 mm long. Prothorax is brown and shiny and 1.10 mm long. Antennal disc is smooth with coarser punctures. Scutellum quadrate. Elytral length is about 3.50 mm. There are nine rows of punctures at each elytron base. Very small and pale brownish hind wings with a total length of about 4.00 mm. Legs are black where both fore-coxae and mid-coxae are punctured.

References 

Cassidinae
Insects of Sri Lanka
Beetles described in 1919